The Tami River is a river in Western New Guinea.

Awyi and Taikat are spoken on the upper part of the Tami River.

See also
List of rivers of Western New Guinea
Tami River languages

References

Rivers of Papua (province)